Calliopsis scutellaris is a species of bee in the family Andrenidae. It is found in Central America and North America.

Subspecies
These two subspecies belong to the species Calliopsis scutellaris:
 Calliopsis scutellaris peninsularis (Cockerell, 1923)
 Calliopsis scutellaris scutellaris

References

Further reading

 
 

Andrenidae
Articles created by Qbugbot
Insects described in 1899